Rupe is a masculine given name, often a diminutive form (hypocorism) of Rupert. People named Rupe include:

 Rupert Rupe Andrews (1926-2008), American player in the Canadian Football League
 Rupe Benstead (1889–1961), Australian rules footballer
 Rupe Bethune (1917–1984), Australian rules footballer
 Rupe Brownlees (1888–1960), Australian rules footballer
 Rupe Dodd (1907–1998), Australian rules footballer
 Rupe Hannah (1900-1983), Australian rules footballer
 Rupert Rupe Hiskins (1893–1976), Australian rules footballer
 Rupe Hutton (1906–1987), Australian rules footballer
 Rupe Lowell (1893–1980), Australian rules footballer
 Rupe McDonald (1910–1969), Australian rules footballer
 Rupe Perrett (1909-1966), Australian rules footballer
 Rupert Smith (American football) (1897-1959), American college football player

Masculine given names
Hypocorisms